Ryan Harper (born 16 April 1987) is a Scottish former professional footballer who played as a striker.

Career
Born in Barrhead, East Renfrewshire, Harper spent his entire senior career in Spain where he arrived at the age of seven, but competed mainly in the lower leagues. He represented UD Fuengirola Los Boliches, Polideportivo Ejido B, CD Villanueva, Fútbol Alcobendas Sport, Unión Estepona CF, Real Betis B (he even signed a professional contract with the club in October 2010, but never appeared officially for the first team), CD Guadalajara, CF Fuenlabrada and Algeciras CF.

Harper only played at the professional level with Guadalajara. On 10 September 2011 he made his Segunda División debut, coming on as a second-half substitute in a 2–1 home win against SD Huesca. He scored in the following round to help to a 3–3 draw at Villarreal CF B, but suffered an anterior cruciate ligament injury to his left knee shortly after, going to miss the vast majority of the season.

Ryan Harper currently works as co-director in the Spanish subsidiary of Wasserman Media Group and is a registered agent of the Royal Spanish Football Federation (RFEF).

Personal life
Harper's younger brothers, Jack and Mac, were also footballers.

References

External links

1987 births
Living people
People from Barrhead
Sportspeople from East Renfrewshire
Scottish footballers
Association football forwards
Segunda División players
Segunda División B players
Tercera División players
UD Fuengirola Los Boliches players
CD Paracuellos Antamira players
Betis Deportivo Balompié footballers
CD Guadalajara (Spain) footballers
CF Fuenlabrada footballers
Algeciras CF footballers
Scottish expatriate footballers
Expatriate footballers in Spain
Scottish expatriate sportspeople in Spain